Dieter Gehmacher (born 9 May 1949) is an Austrian bobsledder. He competed in the four man event at the 1976 Winter Olympics.

References

1949 births
Living people
Austrian male bobsledders
Olympic bobsledders of Austria
Bobsledders at the 1976 Winter Olympics
Sportspeople from Salzburg